Several ships have been named Fulton, at least some after the American pioneer of steam-powered water transport Robert Fulton.

Five ships of the United States Navy have borne the name USS Fulton:
 , later Fulton, a catamaran steam frigate, launched in 1815, delivered to the Navy in 1816 and used as a receiving ship until she exploded in 1829
 , a sidewheel steamer launched in 1837, captured by the Confederates in 1861 and destroyed in the evacuation of Pensacola in 1862
 , a submarine tender launched in 1914, reclassified as a gunboat (PG-49) in 1930, and decommissioned in 1934
 , a tugboat, converted into a patrol vessel and in commission from 1917 to 1919

Other ships
 , launched in 1833 and served until 1867
 , a steamer chartered by the Union Army during the American Civil War
 , launched in 1911, built by A. C. Brown & Son, Tottenville, New York for NY & NJ SS Co.
 , launched in 1919 and served until 1935
 , originally named Fulton, launched in 1904 and the prototype for s

See also
 , a sternwheel steamer in service as a tender with the United States Army's Ram Fleet from 1862 to ca. 1864
 , a New York excursion vessel built in 1909 for Hudson River Day Line and finally scrapped in 1968
 Robert Fulton, a Liberty ship built in 1942

Ship names